The 2006–07 Top League was the fourth season of Japan's domestic rugby union competition, the Top League. The league was expanded to from 12 to 14 teams for the 2006–07 season.

The top four teams in the league played in the Microsoft Cup which was officially integrated into the league from this season as the "Top League Play-off Tournament Microsoft Cup". The title was won by Toshiba Brave Lupus which also won the All-Japan Championship.

Teams
Coca-Cola West Red Sparks and IBM Big Blue were promoted to the league, bringing the number of teams from 12 to 14.

Regular season

Final standings

Fixtures and results

Title play-offs

The top four teams in the league were Toshiba, Suntory, Yamaha, and Toyota. They played in the Microsoft Cup (2007) knock-out tournament to fight it out for the Top league title, which was officially integrated into the league from this season as the "Top League Play-off Tournament Microsoft Cup".

The cup was won by Toshiba Brave Lupus which also won the All-Japan Championship.

Semi-finals

Final

Top League Challenge Series

Kyuden Voltex and Mitsubishi Sagamihara DynaBoars won promotion to the 2007–08 Top League via the 2007 Top League Challenge Series, while Honda Heat and Kintetsu Liners progressed to the promotion play-offs.

Promotion and relegation play-offs
Two promotion/relegation matches (Irekaesen) were played with the winners qualifying for the 2007–08 Top League.

The 11th placed team from the Top League played against the 1st placed team from Challenge 2. The 12th placed team from the Top League played against the 3rd placed team from Challenge 1. 

So IBM (despite only obtaining a draw against Kinetsu), and Ricoh remained in the Top League for 2007–08.

References

Japan top league
2006–07 in Japanese rugby union
2006-07